The SS Eugenio C was a 1966 Italian built ocean liner/cruise ship originally owned by the Costa Line. She was scrapped as the Big Red at Alang, India in June 2005.

History
Eugenio C was ordered for the South American service by Costa (Linea C), to replace the Frederico C on that route. Her keel was laid on 4 January 1964, with Eugenio C being delivered to Costa on 22 August 1966, the same day she set out on her maiden trans-Atlantic voyage. For 10 years she only operated trans-Atlantic voyages between Genoa and South America, until passenger loading dropped rapidly in the 1970s, when the Eugenio C began cruising. After 1983 she would cross the Atlantic Ocean twice a year on a repositioning voyage. In 1984 she was extensively renovated and renamed the Eugenio Costa. It was planned the vessel would be renamed American Adventure and transferred to American Family Cruises, which was to be a branch of Costa, but this plan was never realized. Eugenio Costa completed her last cruise for her original owners in November 1996.

Costa sold the Eugenio Costa to the Bremer Vulcan shipyards in part exchange for the construction of the Costa Victoria. Lowline Shipping would go on to acquire her and well charter her to Direct Cruises, a British cruise line which offered budget cruises marketed via telemarketing. $12 million USD was spent on refitting the Eugenio Costa into the Edinburgh Castle. The vessel's mechanical problems brought about great difficulty to Direct and Lowline, until Direct filed for liquidation and Lowline Shipping filed for bankruptcy in 1999. Ownership of Edinburgh Castle was passed on to Lowline's main creditor, shipbuilder Cammell Laird.

Cammell Laird chartered the vessel to Premier Cruises, renaming her The Big Red Boat II and having her go under a 10-month $25 million USD overhaul. Premier went into liquidation in September 2000, as a result Cammell Laird briefly chartered her to the United States Government, after which time she was laid up at Freeport, Bahamas alongside fellow ex-Premier fleet mates Rembrandt and Big Red Boat III.

Demise
The Big Red Boat II was sold to Argo Ship Management, who kept her up on the market. By 2005 it was obvious cruise companies were not willing to take their chances with her due to her history of mechanical problems. The vessel was renamed Red Boat, stopping in the Azores to refuel before being broken up for scrap at Alang scrapyards.

References 

1964 ships
Cruise ships of the United Kingdom
Ocean liners
Ships of Costa Cruises
Ships built in Monfalcone
Ships built by Cantieri Riuniti dell'Adriatico